The Fréjus Tunnel may refer to one of two tunnels connecting Modane, France with Bardonecchia, Italy:

 the Fréjus Rail Tunnel, also known as the Mont Cenis Tunnel, completed in 1871.
 the Fréjus Road Tunnel, completed in 1980.